North Springfield is an unincorporated community in Erie County, Pennsylvania, United States. North Springfield has a post office with ZIP code 16430.

References

Unincorporated communities in Erie County, Pennsylvania
Unincorporated communities in Pennsylvania